Marcel Vandewattyne (7 July 1924 – 18 September 2009) was a Belgian long-distance runner who competed in the 1948 Summer Olympics and in the 1952 Summer Olympics.

References

1924 births
2009 deaths
Belgian male long-distance runners
Olympic athletes of Belgium
Athletes (track and field) at the 1948 Summer Olympics
Athletes (track and field) at the 1952 Summer Olympics